Don't Look Away is a studio album by English musician Alexander Tucker. It was released on 24 August 2018 through Thrill Jockey.

The album is the third in a trilogy, made previous by Dorwytch (2011) and Third Mouth (2012).

Accolades

Track listing

References

2018 albums
Thrill Jockey albums